Petter Thoresen (born 25 July 1961 in Oslo, Norway) is a Norwegian ice hockey coach and former player, currently serving as head coach of Storhamar Hockey, where he has been in charge since June 2022. He played for Forward, Hasle/Løren, Manglerud Star, Storhamar Dragons and Vålerenga. He is the father of players Steffen Thoresen and Patrick Thoresen.

Playing career
In Vålerenga, he reached 367 points in 220 games, which gives him a fourth place on the club's all-time high list.

Before the 1992–93 season, he transferred to Storhamar Dragons, where he obtained 155 points in 150 matches.

Coaching career
Half-way through the 1995/1996 season, he became a manager for Storhamar Dragons, and led them to the Norwegian title, his first as a coach. In 2000 he signed with Vålerenga, and served as their coach until 2004, when he went back to Storhamar Dragons to help them get stability in a struggling team. In 2009 he signed a 3-year contract with Stavanger Oilers. He left Oilers in 2016 to become the head coach of the Norwegian national team.
Today he is the head coach of Storhamar Hockey.

International career
He has played 96 matches for the Norwegian national team, which makes him the fifth most featured player on the national team. He appeared at five Olympics, the first in 1980 and last in 1994, becoming the second hockey player to do so after Germany's Udo Kießling.

Championships
Player:
 Vålerenga:
 1984/1985 - Norwegian Champions
 1986/1987 - Norwegian Champions
 1987/1988 - Norwegian Champions
 1990/1991 - Norwegian Champions

 Coach:
 Storhamar Dragons:
 1995/1996 - Norwegian Champions
 1996/1997 - Norwegian Champions
 1999/2000 - Norwegian Champions

 Vålerenga:
 2000/2001 - Norwegian Champions
 2003/2004 - Norwegian Champions

 Stavanger Oilers:
2009/2010 - Norwegian Champions
2011/2012 - Norwegian Champions
2012/2013 - Norwegian Champions
2013/2014 - Norwegian Champions
2014/2015 - Norwegian Champions
2015/2016 - Norwegian Champions

References

External links

 

1961 births
Living people
Hasle-Løren IL players
Ice hockey players at the 1980 Winter Olympics
Ice hockey players at the 1984 Winter Olympics
Ice hockey players at the 1988 Winter Olympics
Ice hockey players at the 1992 Winter Olympics
Ice hockey players at the 1994 Winter Olympics
Manglerud Star Ishockey players
Norway men's national ice hockey team coaches
Norwegian ice hockey coaches
Norwegian ice hockey right wingers
Olympic ice hockey players of Norway
Ice hockey people from Oslo
Stavanger Oilers coaches
Storhamar Dragons coaches
Storhamar Dragons players
Vålerenga Ishockey coaches
Vålerenga Ishockey players
Ice hockey coaches at the 2018 Winter Olympics